Idiomarina marina is a Gram-negative, aerobic and heterotrophic bacterium from the genus of Idiomarina which has been isolated from seawater from the An-Ping Harbour in Taiwan.

References

Bacteria described in 2009
Alteromonadales